Shamsul Huda Bihari (S. H. Bihari) (1920–1987) was an Indian lyricist, songwriter and poet whose work was widely recorded and used in Bollywood movies during the latter half of the 20th century.

Bihari was born in Arrah, Bihar, India. He lived at Madhupur, Deoghar dist. in Jharkhand. His ancestral villa still exists in Madhupur. He died in 1987.

Career 
S.H.Bihari is best known for writing lyrics for films in Hindi and Urdu and was also fluent in Bengali. In 1985, along with the lyrics for the songs, Bihari also wrote the script for the film Pyaar Jhukta Nahin.

In a radio programme on the Vividh Bharati channel of All India Radio (VBS- UJALE UNKI YAADON KE- DAASTANE O P NAYYAR- PART- 3)  composer O.P.Nayyar said from his perspective, he regarded S.H.Bihari as "Shayar-e-azam" i.e. King or Emperor among poets. S.H.Bihari wrote songs in many movies for which O.P.Nayyar composed music. In 2006, poet, lyricist and screenwriter Javed Akhtar cited Bihari as a role-model, describing him as a "mindblowing … poet whom no one remembers today".

Filmography

References

External links 
 shbihari.com contains a more complete listing of his songs
 

1987 deaths
People from Deoghar district
Indian lyricists
Hindi-language lyricists
Indian male songwriters
Hindustani language
Indian male poets
20th-century Indian poets
Poets from Bihar
Bengali-language writers
20th-century Indian male writers
1922 births